The 1886 Tennessee gubernatorial election was held on November 2, 1886. Democratic nominee Robert Love Taylor defeated his brother, Republican nominee Alfred A. Taylor with 53.52% of the vote.

General election

Candidates
Robert Love Taylor, Democratic
Alfred A. Taylor, Republican

Results

References

1886
Tennessee
Gubernatorial